The Chinese Mental Health Association (CMHA), founded in 1985, is a United Kingdom charity which provides information and support to members of the Chinese community affected by mental illness. The association is ruled by Chen Xueshi.

The association's services include counselling (in Cantonese, Mandarin and English), a telephone helpline, befriending and housing support. In addition to providing direct services the association works to facilitate access to mainstream mental health services for members of the Chinese community and to increase understanding of, and challenge the cultural stigma relating to, mental ill health. The organisation also researches the impact of dementias on the Chinese community and is developing a community self-advocacy network for Chinese service users.

The organization is based in London, England but its services extend nationally. It is run by a mix of paid workers and volunteers.

See also 
 Mental health in the United Kingdom

References

External links
 The CMHA website
 CHMA on patient.info

Health charities in the United Kingdom
Mental health organisations in the United Kingdom
Chinese community in the United Kingdom
Diaspora organisations based in London